The Coimbatore Municipal Corporation is the civic body that governs the city of Coimbatore in the Indian state of Tamil Nadu. It is the second largest municipal corporation in Tamil Nadu only after the Greater Chennai Corporation with an area of 246.75 sq km.

History 
The municipality of Coimbatore was established in 1866 according to the Town Improvements Act of 1865, with industrialist Sir Robert Stanes as its first Chairman. The early days of the municipality were difficult as it had to tackle plague epidemics and earthquakes. In 1934, the municipality elected its first woman Chairman, K. Thankamma Jacob.Justice Party politician R. K. Shanmukham Chetty served as the Vice-Chairman of the municipality from 1917 to 1920. in 1981, Coimbatore was elevated to a municipal corporation, the third in Tamil Nadu by the merger of Singanallur Municipality with Coimbatore Municipality. In 2011, Coimbatore Corporation limits were expanded by merging nearby areas of Coimbatore and making its area from 105 km² to 247 km². In 2012, the Corporation won the "Best Corporation Award" from the Government of Tamil Nadu.

Logo 
The logo of the Coimbatore Corporation includes Indian national flag.

Area
In 2011, the area was expanded to include certain local bodies in the metropolitan area into the city limits. The city is surrounded by reserve forests on the northern side, the Western Ghats on the western and northern part.

Structure 
This corporation consists of 100 wards and is headed by a mayor who presides over a deputy mayor and other councillors who represent the wards. The mayor is elected directly through a first past the post voting system and the deputy mayor is elected by the councillors from among their numbers.

Administration 
For administrative purpose the Coimbatore corporation is divided into five zones namely North, South, East, West and Central headed by a chairman.
 The North Zone will have Wards 1, 2, 3, 4, 10, 11, 12, 13, 14, 15, 18, 19, 20, 21, 25, 26, 27, 28, 29, 30
 The East Zone will have Wards 5, 6, 7, 8, 9, 22, 23, 24, 50, 51, 52, 53, 54, 55, 56, 57, 58, 59, 60, 61
 The Central Zone will have Wards 31, 32, 46, 47, 48, 49, 62, 63, 64, 65, 66, 67, 68, 69, 70, 80, 81, 82, 83, 84
 The South Zone will have Wards 76, 77, 78, 79, 85, 86, 87, 88, 89, 90, 91, 92, 93, 94, 95, 96, 97, 98, 99, 100
 The West Zone will have Wards 16, 17, 33, 34, 35, 36, 37, 38, 39, 40, 41, 42, 43, 44, 45, 71, 72, 73, 74, 75,

The offices of the respective zones are located at the following locations:

Elections

In the 2022 Tamil Nadu urban local body elections, DMK and its allies in the Secular Progressive Alliance, won 96 wards out of total 100 wards for Coimbatore Municipal Corporation. The DMK won 76 and its allies 20. Among the allies of DMK, Congress won nine, CPI and CPI(M) - four each, and MDMK three wards. The incumbent ruling party in the Coimbtore corporation council, AIADMK won three seats. Social Democratic Party of India won 1 ward.

Utilities 
The executive wing of the corporation is headed by a Corporation Commissioner assisted by Deputy Commissioner. The corporation runs and maintains basic services like water, sewage and roads. The district itself is administered by the District Collector.

Law enforcement 
The Coimbatore City Police was formed in 1972 after the bifurcation of the existing Coimbatore Police Force to assist in law enforcement. Coimbatore police commissionerate was formed in 1990. The jurisdiction of the Commissionerate of Police extends to the jurisdictional limits of the Coimbatore City Municipal Corporation. In 2011, when the limits of the Municipal Corporation were increased, the jurisdiction of the police was also increased to include newly added areas. There are 18 police stations in Coimbatore City, numbered B - 1 to B - 15 along with three "All-Women" Police stations. The CCP has three wings: traffic, law and order, and crime. Each of these wings comes under four zones: North, South, East and West. The District Court is the highest court of appeal in Coimbatore.

Notes

External links 

Municipal corporations in Tamil Nadu
Government of Coimbatore
1866 establishments in British India
1981 establishments in Tamil Nadu